is the second studio album by the Japanese girl band Princess Princess, released on February 26, 1988, by CBS Sony. It features the singles "My Will", "19 Growing Up (Ode to My Buddy)", and "Go Away Boy".

The album peaked at No. 8 on Oricon's albums chart.

Track listing 
All music is arranged by Princess Princess.

Charts

References

External links
 
 
 

Princess Princess (band) albums
1988 albums
Sony Music Entertainment Japan albums
Japanese-language albums